Hieronymus (Jerome) (c. 722 - after 782), was the son of Charles Martel and his mistress Ruodhaid, and so was the brother of Bernard, Abbot of St. Quentin, a key confidant of Louis the Pious, and Remigius, the third Archbishop of Rouen.

In 754, Hieronymus was tasked with Fulradus, abbot of St. Denys, and others, to escort Pope Stephen II back to Rome. This was following King Pipin's victorious campaign against his archenemy Aistulf, King of the Lombards.   He became lay abbot of the monastery of St. Quentin in the diocese of Noyon.  He was succeeded by his son Fulrad.

Hieronymus married Ercheswinda (Ermentrudis), origins unknown, and they had four children:
 Audoen I 
 Fulrad (d. 31 January  826), Abbé de Saint-Quentin and an imperial ''missi of Charlemagne in 806.
 Richarda, married Nithard
 Folcuin (d. 15 Dec 855), Bishop of Thérouanne, 817–855.

Settipani suggests that Boso of Provence descended from Hieronymus, although there does not appear to be any real evidence to support this.

References

Sources 

Medieval Lands Project, Family of Hieronymus

Settipani, Christian, La préhistoire des Capétiens 481-987, 1ère partie, Mérovingiens, Carolingiens et Robertiens, Broché, 1993

Murray, J., A Dictionary of Christian Biography, Literature, Sects and Doctrines: Being a Continuations of the Dictionary of the Bible, Forgotten Books, 1882 (available on  Internet Archive)

Capetian dynasty
House of Capet